Saxifraga umbrosa, called true London pride, none-so-pretty, king's feather, kiss-me-quick, leaf of St Patrick, look-up-and-kiss-me, mignonette of the French, Nancy-pretty, prattling Parnell, Pyrenean saxifrage, sailor plant, St Anne's needlework, St Patrick's cabbage, and whimsey, although some of these names may more properly belong to Saxifraga spathularis, or its hybrid with S.spathularis, Saxifraga × urbium, is a species of flowering plant in the family Saxifragaceae. It is native to the Pyrenees, and has been introduced elsewhere in Europe, and to southern Chile. Its cultivar 'Clarence Elliott' has gained the Royal Horticultural Society's Award of Garden Merit.

References

umbrosa
Garden plants of Europe
Flora of France
Flora of Spain
Plants described in 1762
Taxa named by Carl Linnaeus